William T. Walters (born July 15, 1946) is an American entrepreneur, philanthropist, and one of the most successful American sports bettors of all time, having a winning streak which extended for over 30 years. 

In 1987, Walters stopped all gambling other than sports betting and returned to his roots in business. As of 2016, his holding company owned interests in eight car dealerships with one under construction, one golf course on the Las Vegas Strip, a rental-car franchise, and a number of commercial properties. In 2014, his net worth was estimated at more than $100 million.

Early life
Walters grew up poor in the rural town of Munfordville, Kentucky. His father, an auto mechanic, died when Walters was 18 months old. His mother, who was an alcoholic, walked out on her son and two daughters shortly after the death of Walters' father. He was raised by his grandmother in a home with no running water or indoor plumbing.

Walters credits his grandmother, a devout Baptist, with instilling a strong work ethic. She worked two jobs cleaning houses and washing dishes while raising seven children. At the age of seven, Walters secured a $40 bank loan for a power lawnmower to start a grass-cutting business. At age nine, he secured a second loan for $90 to start a paper route. His grandmother arranged both loans for Walters.

His grandmother died when Walters was 13, forcing him to move to Louisville, Kentucky, to be with his mother. There he worked two jobs, one in the morning at a bakery and the second at a gas station in the evenings. He rented a room in the basement from his mother, who charged him $10 per week. He married and had a child before graduating high school. The marriage was short-lived.

Business success
In 1965, Walters went to work as a salesman at McMackin Auto Sales, a used-car lot in Louisville. Each time he sold a car, he mailed a self-promotion letter to 10 people living on each side of that customer's home. He would peruse the daily newspaper for car ads, inviting the ads' sellers to do trades with him. He went through the phone book and cold-called people. Walters sold an average of 32 cars a month and earned $56,000 a year in 1966, equal to about $400,000 today.

Walters worked 80 hours a week selling cars and setting dealership records. In 1967, he was hired as sales manager at Steven's Brothers Auto Sales, a competing dealership. He worked at Stevens Brothers until 1972, when he started his own business, Taylor Boulevard Auto Sales, wholesaling cars to other dealers throughout the southeastern United States.

During that time, Walters also remained involved in sports betting. In 1981, he left the automobile industry to become a full-time sports bettor and bookmaker. In 1982, pleaded guilty to a misdemeanor charge of possession of gambling records in Kentucky. He quit booking and the charge was later expunged from his record.

It was then that he decided to move with his wife, Susan, to Las Vegas, where opportunity beckoned and betting on sports was legal.

Gambling career
Walters started gambling when he was 9 years old, when he bet the money he earned from his paper route on the New York Yankees to beat the Brooklyn Dodgers in the 1955 World Series. The Dodgers won and Walters lost the bet, but it did not deter him from gambling. Walters was a losing gambler as late as 1982. He had lost $50,000 by the time he was 22. Walters once lost his house during a game of pitching pennies. The winner did not take possession; Walters agreed to pay off the debt over the next 18 months.

Walters's success changed in his mid to late 30s. In June 1986, Walters requested a freeze-out with Caesars Atlantic City for $2 million at the roulette tables. Walters was known to have lost $1 million at least twice at the Las Vegas blackjack tables. Caesars, however, declined his request. Walters then took his proposition to the Atlantic Club Casino Hotel, then known as the Golden Nugget, which was accepted.

Walters and his gambling partner delivered $2 million to the cage at the Atlantic Club Casino Hotel. The pair noticed a wheel bias and bet on the 7-10-20-27-36. After 38 hours of play they won $3,800,000, beating the prior record of $1,280,000 held by Richard W. Jarecki at the San Remo Casino in Monte Carlo in 1971. Three years later his "Syndicate" had won $400,000 at a casino in Las Vegas and an additional $610,000 from Claridge Casino in Atlantic City. Walters also captured the 1986 Super Bowl of Poker, (also known as Amarillo Slim's Super Bowl of Poker or SBOP) in Lake Tahoe earning $175,000.

Sports betting
In the 1980s, Walters joined the Computer Group, which used computer analysis to analyze sports outcomes. Over a period of 39 years, Walters had only one losing year, with a 30-year winning streak. Though he has finished in the red for a few months, he was always in the black by the end of the year. Walters bet on basketball, the NFL, and college football. Walters won $3.5 million on Super Bowl XLIV after betting on the New Orleans Saints. Due to his reputation, Walters often placed bets through "runners" so bookmakers would remain unaware of the person behind the bet.

In January 2007, Walters won a $2.2 million bet on University of Southern California defeating University of Michigan; USC won, 32–18. In 2011, Walters claimed he could make between $50 to $60 million on a good year.

Insider trading
In April 2017, Walters was found guilty of insider trading after using non-public information from Thomas C. Davis, a board member of Dean Foods. Walters was sentenced to 5 years in prison and fined $10 million. Lawyer Daniel Goldman, then an assistant United States Attorney for the Southern District of New York, was part of the trial team.

Walters's source, company director Thomas C. Davis, using a prepaid cell phone and sometimes the code words "Dallas Cowboys" for Dean Foods, helped Walters, between 2008 and 2014, realize profits and avoid losses in the stock, the Federal jury found. Walters gained $32 million in profits and avoided $11 million in losses. At the trial, investor Carl C. Icahn was mentioned in relation to Walters's trading but was not charged with wrongdoing. Golfer Phil Mickelson "was also mentioned during the trial as someone who had traded in Dean Foods shares and once owed nearly $2 million in gambling debts to" Walters. Mickelson "made roughly $1 million trading Dean Foods shares; he agreed to forfeit those profits in a related civil case brought by the Securities and Exchange Commission".

On December 4, 2018, the U.S. 2nd Circuit Court of Appeals upheld the insider trading conviction and 5 year sentence of Walters, even though it chastised an FBI agent for leaking grand jury information about the case. On October 7, 2019, the U.S. Supreme Court refused to hear Walters's appeal.

Walters was initially imprisoned at Federal Prison Camp, Pensacola, but was released to home confinement in Carlsbad, California, on May 1, 2020, amid the coronavirus pandemic. His sentence was scheduled to be completed on January 10, 2022, and was commuted by Donald Trump on January 20, 2021.

Personal life
Walters has three children, and was an avid golfer. He claims to have made over $400,000 on one hole and once as much as $1 million in one round, although he admitted to losing that same amount at blackjack later that night.

In June 2014, Walters had a private jet worth $20 million and owned seven homes, with a net worth estimated at over $100 million.

Philanthropy
Walters is a noted philanthropist and has donated to Opportunity Village, a Las Vegas nonprofit for people with intellectual disabilities. In September 2020, in response to Opportunity Village canceling their two largest fundraising events because of the COVID-19 pandemic, the Walters family committed to a $1 million matching donation. He and his wife Susan have been staunch Opportunity Village advocates for decades and were honored at the organization’s 11th annual black-tie gala Camelot in 2012.

The couple were also honored as Las Vegas Philanthropists of the Year in 1997 by the Association of Fundraising Professionals Las Vegas Chapter

Billy Walters and his wife Susan say they will donate $1 million to the effort to rebrand the Las Vegas airport.

See also
Billy Walters Homepage
 Alan Woods (gambler)
 Terry Ramsden
 Haralabos Voulgaris

References

1946 births
American gamblers
Living people
People from Munfordville, Kentucky
Recipients of American presidential clemency